The Monefelim River is a river that flows through the county of Kilkenny in Ireland. It is a tributary of the Ballyvalden River before they join the River Barrow. It is part of the Barrow catchment area. The Local Authority is Kilkenny County Council.

See also
 Rivers of Ireland

References

Footnotes

Sources

External links
  
  
 
 

Rivers of County Kilkenny